Mohd Hamzani bin Omar (born 30 September 1978 in Johor, Malaysia) is a former Malaysian footballer and a football coach.

As a football player he mostly spend his career at Johor in the Malaysian league. He won 2001 Liga Perdana 2 with Johor FC. At international level he made international debut against New Zealand on 3 July 1999. 8 years after his international debut, he made a return to the national team and was selected to represent Malaysia for the 2007 AFC Asian Cup. He played one match against Iran at the tournament.

Since 2013, Hamzani has been involved with coaching at Johor Darul Ta'zim. In 2022 Malaysia Super League season, Hamzani briefly took charge of Johor Darul Ta'zim starting from the matches against Penang on 20 July 2022 due to Benjamin Mora's departure.

References

External links
 

1978 births
Living people
Malaysian people of Malay descent
Malaysian footballers
Malaysia international footballers
2007 AFC Asian Cup players
People from Johor
Johor Darul Ta'zim F.C. players
Malaysia Super League players
Association football defenders